Artyom Sergeyevich Serdyuk (born 22 January 1990) is a Russian professional football player who plays for Bahraini club Al-Ahli.

Club career
He made his Russian Football National League debut for FC Baltika Kaliningrad on 11 July 2015 in a game against FC Shinnik Yaroslavl.

External links
 
 
 

1990 births
People from Salsk
Living people
Russian footballers
Association football forwards
FC Rostov players
FC Taganrog players
FC Olimpia Volgograd players
FC Armavir players
FC Baltika Kaliningrad players
FC Fakel Voronezh players
FC Slutsk players
FC Chayka Peschanokopskoye players
FC Volga Ulyanovsk players
FK Khujand players
Al-Ahli Club (Manama) players
Russian First League players
Russian Second League players
Belarusian Premier League players
Tajikistan Higher League players
Bahraini Premier League players
Russian expatriate footballers
Expatriate footballers in Belarus
Russian expatriate sportspeople in Belarus
Expatriate footballers in Tajikistan
Russian expatriate sportspeople in Tajikistan
Expatriate footballers in Bahrain
Russian expatriate sportspeople in Bahrain
Sportspeople from Rostov Oblast